Piebald is an American rock band. Piebald started as a hardcore punk band in Andover, Massachusetts, out of the same scene that produced Converge and Cave In. Originally a key Massachusetts post-hardcore band often seen touring with fellow DIY hardcore bands such as Jesuit, Reversal of Man, and Harvest during the mid to late 1990s, they later moved to the Boston suburb of Somerville and became a staple of the Greater Boston indie rock scene.

History 
Their first gig, a "Battle of the Bands", is chronicled on their two-CD set Barely Legal/All Ages. From the liner notes: "... from the sound board  1994 battle of the bands, Piebald lost."

From there on, they recorded and played shows together semi-seriously. Shortly thereafter in 1995, Piebald started recording, which amounted to a four-track demo, and a two-track split. The driving hardcore sound exhibited during these years was highlighted by the technical playing of drummer Jon Sullivan, and the deep screams of vocalist and guitarist Travis Shettel.

Post-hardcore 
A turning point in Piebald's career came when they recorded seven tracks, and put them on the CD that came to be known as Sometimes Friends Fight. Their musical sound had greatly matured, and Travis' lyrical ability was finally brought to the forefront of the band's music. Another two seven-inches later, Piebald was ready for another metamorphosis.

Eleven tracks recorded at Salad Days became the first record to showcase Piebald's signature sound and wry jokes. Traditionally the most sought-after Piebald recording (before it was immortalized in its entirety on All Ages), When Life Hands You Lemons was considered to be Piebald's best music yet. This release furthered the lyrical style that had been growing within the band, and also showcased the first lead vocals by lead guitarist Aaron Stuart, and a piano track by Shettel.

Breakthrough 

Following If it Weren't for Venetian Blinds, It Would Be Curtains for Us All, Piebald released We Are the Only Friends We Have. It featured the single "American Hearts" which achieved some success, garnering mention on MTV and college radio. This, together with the band's signing to indie label Big Wheel Recreation brought Piebald their most mainstream attention to that date. The trend was continued when the band signed to Side One Dummy label and released their next album, and when Piebald was chosen to play 2004's Warped Tour.

The following album, "All Ears, All Eyes, All the Time", the band's first release on Side One Dummy Records, featured piano-driven compositions, along with horn arrangements and vocal harmonies.

"Accidental Gentlemen," their last album of original work, was released in 2007.

Breakup 
On August 19, 2007, a bulletin was posted from the band's official MySpace page as well as in the "News" section of their official website, announcing the dissolution of Piebald.

"Friends, friends, friends…we have not posted anything anywhere in quite some time and our word on the street is that this is our last tour. All the preceding words are true and we have decided to put Piebald to rest. The past fifteen years or so have been nothing short of extremely incredible. We have met lots of people, been to lots of places and experienced a whole lot of life. In 1994 we started making music, screenprinting our own seven inch covers and borrowing our parents cars to get to shows. Since then, we have traveled the globe, released many records, and played thousands of shows; pedaling the righteous name of piebald to all whose paths we crossed. In celebration of the many years of good times and incredible accomplishments, we have decided to dedicate this tour to us; Piebald. Thanks to all who have helped in any and every way…families, friends, girlfriends, vans, bands, fans, promoters, labels, booking agent, lawyer, clubs, engineers, producers, and those who we forgot to mention. Now, this is not a teary eyed time, people. This is a time of new beginnings, positive vibes, and a congratulatory nod to the past. There has been talk of a few shows to give the band an official sendoff, but as of yet, those shows are not booked and unknown. Thanks for all the undying support. We love you."

The band played three final farewell shows in April 2008: April 17 at the Bowery Ballroom in New York City and April 18 and 19 at The Middle East nightclub in Cambridge, Massachusetts.

Their final release is a live DVD / documentary called "Nobody's Robots: A Farewell to Piebald". It includes the entire farewell show in 5.1 surround sound, a retrospective documentary and an anthology of the band's several music videos. Audio from the show is exclusively available through iTunes. The DVD was released nationwide July 13, 2010, on Sidehatch Entertainment Group.

Reunion 
Piebald reunited at the Bamboozle music festivals in Anaheim, California, on March 28, 2010, and in East Rutherford, New Jersey, on May 2, 2010.

In April 2010, Rise Records released a three-volume set containing out-of-print releases from the band. The set contains material recorded and released by Piebald while signed with Big Wheel Recreation from 1999 to 2002. Each disc also includes various B-sides and rarities.

On March 22, 2016, Piebald was listed on the lineup for Wrecking Ball 2016 August 12–14 at The Masquerade in Atlanta.

On April 6, 2016, Piebald announced their 2016 reunion tour.

In September 2016, Piebald played 5 shows out west with their past tour buddies Limbeck. The tour brought them through San Francisco, Anaheim, Los Angeles, San Diego, and Phoenix.

On January 12, 2017, Piebald was listed on the lineup for Boston Calling 2017.

On September 15, 2018, Piebald played the Riot Fest 2018 in Chicago.

Other projects 
Since Piebald, Travis Shettel has performed in The Was, TS and The Past Haunts, and The Hunting Accident with Aaron Stuart.

Discography

References 

Piebald - Killa Bros and Killa Bees. 2005. Retrieved June 8th, 2022. https://www.amazon.com/Piebald-Killa-Bros-Bees/dp/B000BKSJ3O

External links 
 Official website
 

Musical groups established in 1994
Musical groups disestablished in 2008
Musical groups reestablished in 2016
American emo musical groups
Alternative rock groups from Massachusetts
Musical groups from Massachusetts
Rise Records artists
Defiance Records artists